Charles Radcliff (or Radcliffe or Radclyffe) may refer to:
 Charles Radclyffe (or Radcliff, 1693–1746), English nobleman and Jacobite, titular 5th Earl of Derwentwater
 Charles Walter Radclyffe (1817–1903), English artist
 Charles Bland Radcliffe (1822–1889), English medic
 Charles Radcliff, Sheriff of Pickaway County, Ohio, USA 1931–1961 (father of Dwight Radcliff)
 Charles Radcliffe (born 1941), English cultural critic and political activist